This is a list of archaeological artefacts and epigraphs which have Tamil inscriptions.  Of the approximately 100,000 inscriptions found by the Archaeological Survey of India (2005 report) in India, about 60,000 were in Tamil Nadu

Ancient Tamil Epigraphy 
 Burial of Adichanallur, Tamil Nadu skeletons were found buried in earthenware urns that contained Tamil-Brahmi inscriptions.
Keeladi excavation site in Tamil Nadu found with Tamil-Brahmi inscriptions in various structures and artifacts, on pottery with Tamil names such as Aathan, Uthiran, Kuviran-Aathan and Thisan.'Anaikoddai seal (steatite seal), Tamil-Brahmi inscriptions mixed in with Megalithic Graffiti Symbols found in Anaikoddai, Sri Lanka, 
Potsherds found in Kodumanal and Porunthal
Tamil-Brahmi script dating to 500 BCE found at Porunthal site is located 12 km South West of Palani, Tamil Nadu
Tamil-Brahmi script dating to 500 BCE found at Kodumanal, Chennimalai near Erode, Tamil Nadu
Punch-marked coins of 5th century BCE found at Karur,  on the bank of river Amaravathi, is located at 78 km from Tiruchirappalli, Tamil Nadu
Ancient Pottery dating back to the 4th century BCE have been discovered off shore by marine archaeologists east of Poompuhar, also known as Kaveripattinam is a town in the Nagapattinam district of Tamil Nadu. Kaveripattnam was a thriving ancient capital port city of the Early Chola Empire.

 3rd century BCE 

Tamil-Brahmi inscriptions in caves, Mangulam, Madurai district, Tamil Nadu, 3rd century BCE. There are five caves in the hill of which six inscriptions are found in four caves. The inscriptions mentions that workers of Nedunchezhiyan I, a Pandyan king of Sangam period, (c. 270 BCE) made stone beds for Jain monks. It further details the name of worker for whom he made stone bed. For example, an inscription shows that Kadalan Vazhuthi, a worker of Nedunchezhiyan made stone bed to Jain monk Nanda Sirikuvan. It is one of the protected monuments in Tamil Nadu by the Archaeological Survey of India.
Artifact related to Early Pandyan Kingdom's King Nedunjeliyan I (c. 270 BCE) found in Kovalanpottal, Madurai district, Tamil Nadu
Potsherds with Tamil script found in Korkai, Thoothukudi district, Tamil Nadu, 3rd century BCE
Tamil-Brahmi script dating back to the 3rd century BCE near Thenur, Madurai, Tamil Nadu. Script is written in gold bar

 2nd century BCE 

Black and red ware piece containing Tamil-Brahmi inscription found in Mangudi, Tirunelveli District, Tamil Nadu, 2nd century BCE. The inscription has been deciphered as "Kurummangala Athan yi Yanai Po"
Potsherds with Tamil-Brahmi inscriptions found in Poonagari, Jaffna, Sri Lanka, 2nd century BCE

 1st century BCE 

Tamil-Brahmi script Rock-cavern inscription in Jambai village, Tiruvannamalai District, Tamil Nadu, 1st century BCE. It reads "Satiyaputo Atiyan Nedumaan Anjji itta Paali", In. The meaning of the epigraph may be rendered as "The abode (pali) given by (itta) Atiyan Nedumaan Anji (name), the Satyaputra (title)". Though the record is a short one in a single line, it throws valuable light on various aspects of South Indian history. The inscription clears the doubt about the identity of the Satyaputras, a dynasty of rulers, mentioned in Ashoka's inscriptions in the 3rd century BCE
A broken storage jar with inscriptions in Tamil-Brahmi script in Quseir-al-Qadim, (Leukos Limen), Egypt, 1st century BCE. Two earlier Tamil-Brahmi inscription discoveries at the same site, 1st century BCE. The inscribed text is  paanai oRi'' "pot suspended in a rope net" (which would be பானை ஒறி in the modern Tamil script) as "Muu-na-ka-ra" and "Muu-ca-ka-ti"
Tamil-Brahmi script Rock Bed Inscription for Jain Monks in Sittanavasal, Pudukkottai District, Tamil Nadu, 1st century BCE, It reads as "Eruminatu kumul-ur piranta kavuti-i tenku-cirupocil ilayar ceyta atit-anam"
Silver Ring From Karur, Tamil Nadu with Personal Name "Peravatan" in Tamil-Brahmi script, 1st Century BCE
Megalithic pottery with graffiti symbols that have a strong resemblance to a sign in the Indus script have been found in Sembiyankandiyur and Melaperumpallam villages, Nagapattinam district, Tamil Nadu, 1st Century BCE
Hundreds of potsherds of the Mediterranean region which include rouletted ware, amphorae jar pieces and pieces of red ware with Tamil-Brahmi script have been found in Alagankulam, Ramanathapuram District, Tamil Nadu, 1st century BCE

First millennium AD

See also

References

External links
Tamil Nadu Archaeological Department
Inscription of Rajadhiraja from Manimangalam

 
Archaeological Survey of India
Tamil language
Tamil diaspora in Asia
Sri Lanka inscriptions
Tamil Brahmi script
Ancient Tamil Nadu
Tamilakam